Jeong Jin-uk (born 9 October 1978) is a South Korean speed skater. He competed in the men's 1500 metres event at the 1998 Winter Olympics.

References

1978 births
Living people
South Korean male speed skaters
Olympic speed skaters of South Korea
Speed skaters at the 1998 Winter Olympics
Place of birth missing (living people)